Popoudina griseipennis is a moth of the family Erebidae. It was described by Max Bartel in 1903. It is found in Angola and South Africa.

References

 

Spilosomina
Moths described in 1903